Lathe of Heaven is an album by saxophonist Mark Turner which was released in September 2014 by the ECM label.

Reception

The AllMusic review by Matt Collar states "with his Lathe of Heaven Turner strips back layers of jazz style and language to reveal a sound that is both familiar and utterly new".

All About Jazz reviewer John Kelman said, "As cerebral as Turner's music can be and as considered as his compositional constructs are— oftentimes building surprising significance from the smallest of concepts—Lathe of Heaven manages to stir the soul as much as it challenges the mind".

The Guardian's John Fordham awarded the album 4 stars noting "The set sometimes sounds like Birth of the Cool tunes floated over a 21st-century rhythmic concept, and it’ll be a 2014 polls contender for sure".

In JazzTimes, Michael J. West was less enthusiastic, observing that "Even cerebral musicians need to connect emotionally with their audiences. Tenor saxophonist Mark Turner, who is as cerebral as they come, struggles with this task on Lathe of Heaven ... Turner has the technical tools to build tension and suspense in his music, but flounders when it comes to making them relatable".

On NPR's Fresh Air, Kevin Whitehead said "A lot of action happens at thoughtful medium tempos, and there's beautiful dissonance in the two-horn harmonies ... The music doesn't give up its secrets too fast as he parcels out his themes and subthemes establishing mood through the slow accumulation of details. The slinky melodies map out the terrain foreshadowing the improvised action and interaction. That lets Mark Turner get of novelistic unity of effect. This clean plotting makes a cooler brand of jazz cool all over again".

Track listing
All compositions by Mark Turner
 "Lathe of Heaven" – 6:40
 "Year of the Rabbit" – 12:20
 "Ethan's Line" – 8:01
 "The Edenist" – 8:11
 "Sonnet for Stevie" – 12:57
 "Brother Sister 2" – 10:09

Personnel
 Mark Turner — tenor saxophone
 Avishai Cohen — trumpet
 Joe Martin  — bass
 Marcus Gilmore — drums

References

2014 albums
ECM Records albums
Mark Turner (musician) albums
Albums produced by Manfred Eicher